MI or variants may refer to:

Arts and entertainment

Film and television
 Mi (film), a 2018 Burmese film
 Mission: Impossible (disambiguation), multiple uses of "M.I."
 Mission: Impossible, the first American television series
 Mission: Impossible (film), a movie based on the television series
 Monsters, Inc., a Pixar media franchise and an energy supply factory company in Monstropolis

Music
 Mi, the third note of the scale in solfege
 Mi (Flower Flower album), the 2014 debut album by Flower Flower
 Mi (Super Junior-M album), a 2008 album, also called Me
 Mi (Faye Wong album), a 1994 album
 M.I Abaga (acronym of Mr. Incredible), a Nigerian rapper and musician
 Mi Pasion, an album by Gospel Christian singer Ericson Alexander Molano
 Sammi Cheng, Hong Kong Queen of Pop
 Masked Intruder, an American pop punk band
 M.I., an album by Masked Intruder

Other media
 Maison Ikkoku, a Japanese manga written by Rumiko Takahashi
 Monkey Island series, a series of computer adventure games by LucasArts

Businesses and organizations 
 M&I Bank,  formerly a U.S. bank, now part Bank of Montreal 
 Marching Illini, the marching band at the University of Illinois
 Market intelligence, information relevant to a company's markets used to support decision-making
 Measurement Incorporated, an educational testing company based in North Carolina
 Mechanics Institute
 Micronutrient Initiative, an international not-for-profit agency based in Canada 
 Mil Moscow Helicopter Plant, a Russian design bureau
 Militia Immaculata, a worldwide evangelist movement
 Millennia Institute, a pre-university institution in Singapore
 Mood Indigo (culfest), an annual cultural festival of IIT Bombay
 Mountaineering Ireland, the national representative body for hikers and climbers in Ireland
 Mumbai Indians, an Indian Premier League team
 Musician's Institute, an institution for higher education in California in the United States
 Ordo Clericorum Regularium Ministrantium Infirmis, the Camillians, Catholic religious order
 SilkAir (IATA airline designator)

Food 

 Mì, Vietnamese yellow wheat (or egg) noodles and noodle soup

Language 
 M, a letter in the Latin alphabet
 Mu (letter), a letter in the Greek alphabet
 Mi (cuneiform), a sign in cuneiform writing
 Mi (kana), the romanization of the Japanese kana み and ミ
 Māori language, ISO 639-1 code:mi

Military
Military intelligence, or milint, a military service that uses intelligence gathering disciplines to collect information that informs commanders for decision making processes
MI5, MI6, MI7, MI8, or MI9, the United Kingdom military intelligence sections
Operation MI, a Japanese military operation of World War II

Places 
 Michalovce District, Slovakia (vehicle plate code MI)
 Michigan, postal service abbreviation in the United States
 Metropolitan City of Milan, previously the Province of Milan, Italy (vehicle plate code MI)
 Minden-Lübbecke, Germany (vehicle plate code MI)
 The Mission Inn Hotel & Spa, an historic hotel in Riverside, California, United States
 Mistelbach District, Austria (vehicle plate code MI)
 Phthiotis, Greece (vehicle plate code MI)

Science, technology, and mathematics

Biology, medicine, and psychology 
 Mechanical Index, an ultrasound metric that is used to estimate the possibility of bioeffects
 Mental illness, or mental disorder
 Methylisothiazolinone, or MIT, an ingredient found in personal care products, sometimes erroneously called methylisothiazoline, used as a biocide and preservative
 Motivational Interviewing, a therapeutic approach employed in clinical psychology and cognitive behavioural therapy, especially in substance abuse work 
 Multiple Intelligence, the theory that argues that intelligence, particularly as it is traditionally defined, does not sufficiently encompass the wide variety of abilities humans display
 Myocardial infarction, the technical term for a heart attack

Computing and telecommunications
 Machine Interface, a hardware abstraction used in the IBM System/38's architecture
 Mi (prefix symbol), the IEEE prefix symbol for mebi, that represents 220
 Mi, a brand of electronics company Xiaomi
 Mobile Internet, a browser-based access to the Internet or web applications using a mobile device connected to a wireless network
 Multiple inheritance, a feature of some object-oriented programming languages in which a class can inherit behaviors and features from more than one superclass

Mathematics
 Mathematical induction
 Mutual information, a measure of mutual dependence of two random variables in probability and information theory

Other uses in science and technology
 Malleable iron, a type of cast iron
 Melt Flow Index, a characteristic property of a thermoplastic polymer as a means of quality control
 Mile, a measure of distance in the Imperial system, about 1.6 km
 Mineral-insulated copper-clad cable, a type of electrical cable
 Moment of inertia, a measure of an object's resistance to changes in its rotation rate
 MI, or Mi, magnitude-intensity relation, or magnitude intensity scale, used to assess the magnitude of historic earthquakes that occurred prior to the development of seismographs in the late 19th century, see Mercalli intensity scale
 Multi Interface Shoe, a camera hotshoe introduced by Sony in 2012
Machine intelligence, another name for Artificial intelligence

Other uses 
 1001 (number), in Roman numerals
 Mi (surname), various Chinese people
 Media Indonesia, a newspaper in Jakarta, Indonesia
 Mia (given name)
 Middle initial, in human names
 Monumental Inscription
 Mortgage insurance, or mortgage guaranty, an insurance policy which compensates lenders or investors for losses due to the default of a mortgage loan
 Mi goreng, a fried noodle dish common in Indonesia

See also 
 MII (disambiguation)
 ML (disambiguation)
 M1 (disambiguation)